Abner is an unincorporated community in Montgomery County, North Carolina, United States.

References

Unincorporated communities in Montgomery County, North Carolina
Unincorporated communities in North Carolina